Abell 2061 is a galaxy cluster in the constellation of Corona Borealis. On a larger scale still, Abell 2061, along with Abell 2065, Abell 2067, Abell 2079, Abell 2089, and Abell 2092, make up the Corona Borealis Supercluster. It has a northeast southwest orientation and Abell 2067 lies 1.8 megaparsecs north of it.

References

Corona Borealis
2061
Galaxy clusters